Kalateh-ye Habib may refer to:
 Kalateh-ye Habib, North Khorasan
 Kalateh-ye Habib, South Khorasan